Alger was the sole member of her class of protected cruiser built for the French Navy in the late 1880s and early 1890s. Alger was ordered during the tenure of Admiral Théophile Aube as Minister of Marine according to the theories of the  doctrine.

Alger served with the Northern Squadron early in her career, where she took part in routine peacetime training exercises. In 1895, she was deployed to French Indochina, returning to France in 1897 for a stint with the Mediterranean Squadron. Placed in reserve by 1901, she remained out of service for several years. Reports conflict over her activities in the mid-1900s, with contemporary reports placing her in the Mediterranean for fleet maneuvers, while later historians state the ship was on a second tour in East Asia from 1905. Both agree that Alger served in Asian waters as late as 1908. The ship was reduced to a storage hulk in 1911 and remained in the fleet's inventory until 1939, when she was broken up.

Design

The new ship was to generally follow the patter of the earlier cruiser , but slightly smaller and a revised armament. Unlike Amiral Cécille, which carried a large secondary battery, the new ship would carry only a few medium guns. Galiber took the revised specifications and forwarded them to France's shipyards on 21 July to request refined design proposals.

Eight shipyards responded by early 1886, which the  examined in a meeting on 2 March. They accepted four of the proposals for further refinement, and on 31 July, two of these were formally accepted. Because they were approved at the same time and were generally similar, the two ships are sometimes considered to be the same class, and are referred to as the Alger class, but they are in fact different designs that vary considerably in their particulars. Unlike Jean Bart, Alger adopted Belleville-type water-tube boilers that had been successfully used aboard the unprotected cruiser , and her armament was arranged differently. Marchal adopted a hull form similar to the British cruiser , which had famously exceeded  during her sea trials.

A second ship was ordered to Marchal's design on 14 February 1887, which in turn received the name Alger. Dupuy de Lôme was cancelled on 16 August in favor of a third vessel, an armored cruiser, also named , leaving the second Alger the only member of the class to be built. After both designs entered service, the navy evaluated Alger and the Jean Bart class, finding the latter to have a superior hull form. Alger also proved to be more vulnerable to damage in heavy seas, as the sponsons for the main and secondary guns extended further from the sides of the hull. She also tended to take on water more than the Jean Barts.

General characteristics and machinery

Her hull featured a pronounced ram bow and a tumblehome shape, along with a sloped, overhanging stern. The bow was not strengthened to allow the ship to ram an opponent, however. Alger had a minimal superstructure, consisting primarily of a small conning tower and bridge forward. The cruiser carried a pair of heavy military masts fitted with fighting tops for some of her light guns and observation positions. Her crew varied over the course of her career, amounting to 387–405 officers and enlisted men.

The ship's propulsion system consisted of a pair of 3-cylinder triple-expansion steam engines driving two screw propellers. Steam was provided by twenty-four coal-burning Belleville-type water-tube boilers that were ducted into two funnels.

Armament and armor

The ship was armed with a main battery of four  M1881 28-caliber guns and a secondary battery of six  M1881 30-cal. guns. All of these guns were placed in individual pivot mounts; the 164.7 mm guns were in sponsons located fore and aft, with two guns per broadside. Four of the 138.6 mm guns were in sponsons between the 164 mm guns, one was in an embrasure in the forecastle and the last was in a swivel mount on the stern. For close-range defense against torpedo boats, she carried twelve  M1885 3-pounder Hotchkiss guns, and eight  M1885 Hotchkiss revolver cannon. Alger also carried a pair of  M1881 16-cal. field guns that could be sent ashore with a landing party. She was also armed with five  torpedo tubes in her hull above the waterline. Two were in the bow, one per broadside, and the fifth was in the stern.

Armor protection consisted of wrought iron, the primary component of which was the main armor deck. Below the deck and above the propulsion machinery spaces, a thin  splinter deck protected the engine and boiler rooms from shell fragments that penetrated the main deck.

Modifications
Alger underwent a series of refits throughout her career. In 1893, shortly after entering service, her main and secondary batteries were upgraded to quick-firing guns of the same calibers. These were converted M1881 pattern guns. The ship's military masts were replaced with lighter pole masts in 1897, and her bow and stern torpedo tubes were removed. Her armament was revised again in 1900; the main and secondary batteries remained unchanged, but her light armament now consisted of a pair of 65 mm M1888 50-cal. guns and ten 47 mm guns. She retained the 65 mm field guns, but added three 37 mm guns that could be fitted to the ship's boats. Between 1903 and 1906, the remaining pair of torpedo tubes were removed, and during this period in 1904, her boilers were refurbished.

Service history

The French Navy ordered Alger on 14 February 1887, and the keel for the new ship was laid down at the  shipyard in Cherbourg in November. Her completed hull was launched on 24 November 1889. She was commissioned to begin sea trials in early 1892, including full-power tests in May. Her initial testing was completed in June, at which time she was placed in reserve for alterations including the modernization of her main and secondary guns. The ship remained out of service until 1893, when she was commissioned on 17 April for active service. Alger took part in the fleet maneuvers in 1894; from 9 to 16 July, the ships involved took on supplies in Toulon for the maneuvers that began later on the 16th. A series of exercises included shooting practice, a blockade simulation, and scouting operations in the western Mediterranean. The maneuvers concluded on 3 August.

Alger was sent with the protected cruiser  on a cruise to French Indochina, departing in October 1895. She remained on station in the Far East in 1896, and returned to France in February 1897. After arriving home, she was assigned to the Mediterranean Squadron for the annual maneuvers that were conducted in July. That year, while in Toulon, the ship had her masts replaced. Alger had been deactivated and placed in the reserve fleet by January 1901. During this period, the ship underwent additional refits. The ship's activities in the mid-1900s are unclear; Thomas Brassey's The Naval Annual lists Alger among the vessels that took part in the fleet maneuvers in 1906, which began on 6 July with the concentration of the Northern and Mediterranean Squadrons in Algiers. The maneuvers were conducted in the western Mediterranean, alternating between ports in French North Africa and Toulon and Marseilles, France, and concluding on 4 August.

Alger remained in the Far East in 1908, along with D'Entrecasteaux and Bruix. After returning to France, Alger was decommissioned on 12 October 1910 and was struck from the naval register on 23 November 1911. She was placed for sale in Rochefort that year but was not initially sold, and was therefore used as a hulk in Rochefort through 1914. She was later moved to Lorient, where she was used as a hulk for various purposes from 1920 to 1939. The ship was eventually sold to ship breakers in 1940.

Notes

References

Further reading
 

Alger-class cruisers
Ships built in France
1889 ships